As of July 2018, Wataniya Airways operated to the following destinations:

Terminated Destinations
During its first period of operations the airline operated routes from Kuwait to the following destinations.:
Austria
 Vienna - Vienna International Airport

Egypt
 Cairo - Cairo International Airport
 Sharm El Sheikh - Sharm el-Sheikh International Airport

Italy 
 Rome - Leonardo da Vinci-Fiumicino Airport

Jordan
 Amman - Queen Alia International Airport

Saudi Arabia
 Jeddah - King Abdul Aziz International Airport

Syria
 Damascus - Damascus International Airport

Turkey
 Istanbul - Atatürk International Airport

United Arab Emirates
 Dubai - Dubai International Airport

United Kingdom 
London - London Heathrow Airport

References

External links 
 Wataniya Airways destination list
Wataniya Airways